Giovanni Mincio may refer to:

Giovanni Mincio of Tusculum, antipope Benedict X
Giovanni Mincio of Morrovale, Franciscan and cardinal